Richard Leigh Clifford  (born 1948) is an Australian businessman and corporate executive who served as Chairman of Qantas from 2007 to 2018. Clifford was appointed Chairman at the company's November 2007 Annual General Meeting, succeeding Margaret Jackson. He is also Chairman of Bechtel Australia.

Early life and education
Clifford was educated at the Anglican Church Grammar School and the University of Melbourne, where he graduated with Bachelor of Engineering (Mining) and Master of Engineering Science degrees.

Career
His career with the Rio Tinto Group, starting as a mining engineer and retiring as chief executive, spanned 37 years and included time both in Australia and overseas.

Clifford was the chief executive officer of the Rio Tinto Group from April 2000 to April 2007. He succeeded Peter Costello as the number-one ticketholder for the Essendon Football Club in March 2008. However he was, in turn, replaced by Lindsay Tanner in September 2009. Clifford also served as chairman of the Murdoch Childrens Research Institute.

On 28 June 2018, Clifford announced his intention to resign as Chairman of Qantas. Former Wesfarmers CEO Richard Goyder replaced Clifford as Chairman in October 2018.

Honours
Clifford was appointed Officer of the Order of Australia in the 2008 Australia Day Honours for "service to business through executive roles in the mining industry, to the promotion of international trade and the development of export markets, and to the arts". In June 2022, in the 2022 Queen's Birthday Honours, Clifford was promoted to Companion of the Order of Australia for "eminent service to business in the aviation, arts and education sectors, to the community through charitable support and scholarships, and for philanthropic contributions".

Clifford was awarded a Doctor of Laws (honoris causa) by the University of Melbourne in February 2022.

Personal life
Clifford currently resides in Melbourne, Australia. He is married and has two daughters.

References

1948 births
Australian corporate directors
Australian mining engineers
Businesspeople from Melbourne
Companions of the Order of Australia
Living people
People educated at Anglican Church Grammar School
Qantas people
University of Melbourne alumni